Cascade Creek is a stream located entirely within Grand Teton National Park in the US state of Wyoming. A few miles from its source, Cascade Creek receives water from the South Fork Cascade Creek, doubling its flow. From there, Cascade Creek flows the length of Cascade Canyon and shortly before discharging into Jenny Lake, drops  over Hidden Falls.

References 

Rivers of Wyoming
Landforms of Grand Teton National Park